This is a list of famous or notable Bulgarians throughout history.

Bulgarian monarchs

Kubrat
Batbayan
Asparukh of Bulgaria
Tervel of Bulgaria
Kormesiy of Bulgaria
Sevar of Bulgaria
Kormisosh of Bulgaria
Vinekh of Bulgaria
Telets of Bulgaria
Sabin of Bulgaria
Umor of Bulgaria
Toktu of Bulgaria
Pagan of Bulgaria
Telerig of Bulgaria
Kardam of Bulgaria
Krum of Bulgaria
Omurtag of Bulgaria
Malamir of Bulgaria
Presian of Bulgaria
Boris I Michael
Simeon the Great
Peter I of Bulgaria
Boris II of Bulgaria
Roman of Bulgaria
Samuil of Bulgaria
Gavril Radomir of Bulgaria
Ivan Vladislav of Bulgaria
Presian II of Bulgaria
Peter (II) Delyan of Bulgaria
Constantin Bodin (Peter (III))
Ivan Asen I of Bulgaria
Peter IV of Bulgaria
Kaloyan of Bulgaria
Boril of Bulgaria
Ivan Asen II of Bulgaria
Kaliman I of Bulgaria
Michael Asen I of Bulgaria
Kaliman II of Bulgaria
Mitso Asen of Bulgaria
Constantine Tikh of Bulgaria
Michael Asen II of Bulgaria
Ivaylo of Bulgaria
Ivan Asen III of Bulgaria
George I of Bulgaria
Smilets of Bulgaria
Chaka of Bulgaria
Theodore Svetoslav of Bulgaria
George II of Bulgaria
Michael III Shishman of Bulgaria
Ivan Stephen of Bulgaria
Ivan Alexander of Bulgaria
Ivan Shishman of Bulgaria
Ivan Sratsimir of Bulgaria
Constantine II of Bulgaria
Alexander I of Bulgaria
Ferdinand I of Bulgaria
Boris III of Bulgaria
Simeon II of Bulgaria

Performing arts

Directors
Stephen C. Apostolof
Christo Christov
Slatan Dudow
Georgi Djulgerov
Tonislav Hristov
Lyudmil Kirkov
Nikola Korabov
Nikola Kovachev
Vulo Radev
Petar B. Vasilev
Binka Zhelyazkova

Actors
See also List of Bulgarian actors

Zahari Baharov
Maria Bakalova 
George Baker
Nikolay Binev
Radina Borshosh
Stefan Danailov
Nina Dobrev
Yana Marinova
Itzhak Fintzi
Georgi Georgiev
Georgi Georgiev-Getz
Kiril Gospodinov
Stanislav Ianevski
Gloria Ivanova
Georgi Kaloyanchev
Apostol Karamitev
Nevena Kokanova
Todor Kolev
Victoria Koleva
Julian Kostov
Marius Kurkinski
Moni Moshonov (born 1951), Bulgarian-born Israeli actor and comedian
Stoyanka Mutafova
Lyubomir Neikov
Georgi Partsalev
Katya Paskaleva
Bashar Rahal
Hristo Shopov
Naum Shopov
Petar Slabakov
Kosta Tsonev
Grigor Vachkov

Models

Silvia Dimitrova
Nina Dobrev
Nansi Karaboycheva
Yana Marinova
Diliana Popova

Dancers

Asen Gavrilov

Journalists

 Oggy Boytchev
 Nikolay Kolev - Michmana
 Elena Yoncheva

Television

Todor Kolev
Niki Kunchev
Milen Tsvetkov
Aleksandra Sarchadjieva
Slavi Trifonov
Ralitsa Vassileva

Literature

Authors

Elisaveta Bagryana
Petar Beron
Ran Bosilek
Assen Bossev
Hristo Botev
Elias Canetti
Dobri Chintulov
Chudomir
Clement of Ohrid
Constantine of Preslav
Atanas Dalchev
Dimcho Debelyanov
Alexenia Dimitrova
Dimitar Dimov
Vasil Drumev
Petya Dubarova
John Exarch
Dora Gabe
Nikolai Haitov
Paisiy Hilendarski
Chernorizetz Hrabar
Nikolai Hristozov
Angel Karaliychev
Lyuben Karavelov
Stefan Kisyov
Aleko Konstantinov
Miladinov Brothers
Aleksandra Monedzhikova
Grigor Parlichev
Elin Pelin
Ivailo Petrov
Valeri Petrov
Julian Popov
Maria Popova
Yordan Radichkov
Radoy Ralin
Kuzman Shapkarev
Pencho Slaveykov
Petko Slaveykov
Hristo Smirnenski
Emiliyan Stanev
Zahari Stoyanov
Anton Strashimirov
Stanislav Stratiev
Edvin Sugarev
Dimitar Talev
Tzvetan Todorov
Stefan Tzanev
Nikola Vaptsarov
Ivan Vazov
Pavel Vezhinov
Vladislav the Grammarian
Dobri Voinikov
Sofronii Vrachanski
Peyo Yavorov
Nedyalko Yordanov
Yordan Yovkov

Music

Composers
See also List of Bulgarian composers

Nikola Atanasov
Victor Chuchkov
Alexandra Fol
Marin Goleminov
Michail Goleminov
Dobri Hristov
Nikolay Kaufman
Nikolo Kotzev
Petar Krumov
John Kukuzelis
Filip Kutev
Kiril Lambov
Milcho Leviev
Emanuil Manolov
Georgi Minchev
Dimitar Nenov
Ivo Papasov
Albena Petrovic-Vratchanska
Stefan Popov
Anna-Maria Ravnopolska-Dean
Petko Stainov
Dobrinka Tabakova
Ralitsa Tcholakova
Georgi Tutev
Stefan Valdobrev
Pancho Vladigerov

Singers and musicians
''See also List of Bulgarian musicians and singers

100 Kila
Alexis Weissenberg
Andrea
Angela Tosheva
Azis
Boris Christoff
Christina Morfova
Desi Slava
Elena Nicolai
Elitsa Todorova
Emil Dimitrov
Filipp Kirkorov
Gena Dimitrova
Georgi Minchev
Gery-Nikol
Gloria
Ivan Yanakov (pianist)
Ivanka Ninova
Ivo Papasov
Kiril Marichkov
Kamen Tchanev
Lili Ivanova
Ljuba Welitsch
Ludmilla Diakovska
Marius Kurkinski
Mira Aroyo
Nayden Todorov
Neva Krysteva
Nicolai Ghiaurov
Nikola Giuzelev
Poli Genova
Raina Kabaivanska
Ralitsa Tcholakova
Slavi Trifonov
Spens
Stefan Valdobrev
Svetla Protich
Sylvie Vartan
Theodosii Spassov
Valya Balkanska
Vassil Naidenov
Vesselina Kasarova
Yildiz Ibrahimova
Yoan Kukuzel

Visual arts

Architects

 Victoria Angelova
 Milka Bliznakov
 Andrey Damyanov
 Kolyu Ficheto
 Georgi Fingov
 Naum Torbov

Painters

 Angel Metodiev
 Bencho Obreshkov
 Boris Georgiev
 Christo Yavashev – Christo
 Chudomir
 Dechko Uzunov
 Dimitre Mehandjiysky
 Ekaterina Savova-Nenova
 George Papazov
 Hristofor Zhefarovich
 Ilia Beshkov
 Ivan Markvichka
 Ivan Nenov
 Jules Pascin
 Keratza Vissulceva
 Konstantin Shtarkelov
 Nikola Avramov
 Nikola Marinov
 Radi Nedelchev
 Silvia Dimitrova
 Vladimir Dimitrov - Maistora
 Yaroslav Veshin
 Yanko Tihov
 Zahariy Zograf
 Zlatyu Boyadzhiev

Sculptors

Ivan Minekov
Christo
Todor Todorov
Vezhdi Rashidov

Others

 Annie Ivanova, arts curator
 Christo Vladimirov Javacheff, along with Jeanne-Claude
 Peter Lazarov, graphic artist
 Alex Maleev, cartoonist
 Toma Tomov, graphic artist

Business

Delyan Peevski
Emil Kyulev
Georgi Naydenov
Iliya Pavlov
Kroum Pindoff
Tihomir Kamenov

State

Politicians

Georgi Atanasov
Prince Alexander of Battenberg
Nikola Mushanov
Boyko Borisov
Todor Burmov
Teodor Teodorov
Filip Dimitrov
Georgi Dimitrov
Konstantin Dimitrov
Simeon Djankov
Kimon Georgiev
Reneta Indzhova
Vasil Kolarov
Ivan Kostov
Andrey Lukanov
Nadezhda Mihailova
Georgi Parvanov
Solomon Pasi
Vasil Radoslavov
Simeon Saxe-Coburg-Gotha
Aleksandar Stamboliyski
Stefan Stambolov
Aleksandar Malinov
Petar Stoyanov
Andrey Lyapchev
Zhan Videnov
Zhelyu Zhelev
Todor Zhivkov

Revolutionaries

Todor Aleksandrov
Georgi Benkovski
Dame Gruev
Gotse Delchev
Tsanko Dyustabanov
Hadzhi Dimitar
Panayot Hitov
Todor Kableshkov
Stefan Karadzha
Lyuben Karavelov
Nikola Karev
Asen Kojarov
Vasil Levski
Georgi Obretenov
Nikola Obretenov
Tonka Obretenova
Gjorche Petrov
Yane Sandanski
Boris Sarafov
Georgi Sava Rakovski
Hristo Tatarchev
Filip Totyu
Panayot Volov
Stoyan Zaimov
Hristo Botev
Mara Buneva

Voivodes

Angel
Apostol Petkov
Chavdar
Ilyo
Indzhe
Karposh
Manush
Kapitan Petko Voyvoda

Academics

Stephan Angeloff, microbiologist
Krassimir Atanassov, mathematician
Angel Balevski, inventor
Petar Beron, educator
Veselin Beshevliev, classicist
Georgi Bliznakoff, chemist
Kiril Bratanov, biologist
Ljubomir Chakaloff, mathematician
George Chaldakov, vascular biologist
Stamen Grigorov, physician
Asen Hadjiolov, biologist
Anastas Ishirkov, human geographer
Christo Ivanov, organic chemist
Assen Jordanoff, airplane constructor
Rostislaw Kaischew, physical chemist
Ludmil Katzarkov, mathematician
Georgi Kitov, archaeologist
Boicho Kokinov, cognitive scientist
Georgi Lozanov, psychologist
Georgi Manev, physicist
Stefan Marinov, dissident physicist
Marco Mincoff, literary scholar
Georgi Nadjakov, physicist, discovered the external photoeffect
Nikola Obreshkov, mathematician
Dimiter Orahovats, physiologist
Dimitar Paskov, pharmacist and chemist
Angel Penchev, neurologist
Peter Petroff, prolific inventor
Ivan Atanassov Petrov, neurologist
Stefka Petrova, nutritionist
Dimitar Sasselov, astrophysicist
Blagovest Sendov, mathematician
Ivan Stranski, physical chemist, proposed the mechanism of Stranski-Krastanov growth
Elka Todorova, social psychologist
Evgeny Vatev, physicist, inventor
Asen Zlatarov, chemist
Vasil Zlatarski, historian

Economists

Stoyan Alexandrov
Lyuben Berov
Martin Dimitrov
Simeon Djankov
Kristalina Georgieva
Nikolay Nenovsky
Antoaneta Vassileva

Philosophers

 Peter Deunov
 Julia Kristeva
 Isaac Passy
 Tzvetan Todorov
 Maria Todorova

Sports

Athletics

Rostislav Dimitrov, triple jumper
Yordanka Donkova, world record holder and one world title in hurdling (1988)
Stefka Kostadinova, world record holder and two world titles in high jump (1987, 1995)
Tereza Marinova, triple jumper
Khristo Markov, 1988 Olympic triple jump champion
Petya Pendareva, sprinter
Iva Prandzheva, long jumper and triple jumper

Boxing

Georgi Kostadinov, boxer, won the Olympic Flyweight gold medal at the 1972 Munich Olympic Games for Bulgaria
Daisy Lang, boxer, world champion in three different weight categories
Ivailo Marinov, boxer, won the Olympic Flyweight gold medal at the 1988 Seoul Olympic Games, among others
Kubrat Pulev, boxer
Tervel Pulev, boxer
Svilen Rusinov, boxer

Chess

Ivan Cheparinov, chess player
Antoaneta Stefanova, Women's World Chess Champion (2004)
Silvio Danailov, chess player and manager
Veselin Topalov, World Chess Champion (2005)

Volleyball

Aleksandra Delcheva
Strashimira Filipova
Lyubomir Ganev
Evgeni Ivanov
Matey Kaziyski
Plamen Konstantinov
Nikolay Nikolov
Vladimir Nikolov
Teodor Salparov
Martin Stoev
Hristo Tsvetanov
Eva Yaneva
Boyan Yordanov
Ivan Zarev
Antonina Zetova
Andrey Zhekov
Dimitar Zlatanov

Football

Georgi Asparuhov
Krassimir Balakov
Dimitar Berbatov
Hristo Bonev
Dinko Dermendzhiev
Petar Houbchev
Trifon Ivanov
Ivan Kolev
Emil Kostadinov
Nikola Kotkov
Yordan Letchkov
Stanislav Manolev
Borislav Mihaylov
Dimitar Penev
Luboslav Penev
Martin Petrov
Stiliyan Petrov
Aleksandar Shalamanov
Nasko Sirakov
Hristo Stoichkov
Darin Todorov
Emil Urumov
Dimitar Yakimov
Zlatko Yankov
Petar Zhekov
Andrey Zhelyazkov

Tennis

Grigor Dimitrov
Katerina Maleeva
Magdalena Maleeva
Manuela Maleeva 
Tsvetana Pironkova

Other sports

Blagoy Blagoev, silver medalist in Olympic Games (1980) and all-time senior world record holder in snatch (195.5 kg, competing at 90 kg)
Nikolay Bukhalov, two Olympic and five world titles in canoeing
Albena Denkova, World Figure Skating Champion in ice dancing (pairs) (2006, 2007)
Vasil Etropolski (born 1959), Olympic and world champion sabre fencer
Georgi Georgiev, two world titles in Sambo (2003, 2006)
Maria Gigova, three rhythmic gymnastics world titles (1969, 1971, 1973), Guinness World Records
Mariya Grozdeva, sport shooter
Ivan Ivanov, Olympic weightlifter
Tanyu Kiryakov, pistol shooter
Dan Kolov, wrestler
Kaloyan Mahlyanov (Kotooshu), sumo wrestler
Maria Petrova, three rhythmic gymnastics world titles (1993, 1994, 1995), Guinness World Records
Hristo Prodanov, mountaineer
Evgeniya Radanova, speed skater and racing cyclist
Neshka Robeva, rhythmic gymnast
Alexander Rusev, wrestler, rower and powerlifter
Valentin Yordanov, two Olympic, seven world and seven European titles in wrestling
Yordan Yovchev, world champion and six-time Olympic gymnast

Theology

Antim I
Evtimiy of Tarnovo
Vladislav the Grammarian
Peter Deunov (Master Beinsa Douno), founder of the Universal White Brotherhood

Cuisine

Silvena Rowe
Ivan Zvezdev

Criminals

 Borislav Georgiev
 Emil Kyulev
 Georgi Iliev
 Georgi Stoev
 Iliya Pavlov
 Konstantin "Samokovetsa" Dimitrov
 Vasil Iliev

Gallery

See also
 Bulgaria
 Bulgarians
 Bulgarian language

Notes